The 1995-96 West Coast Hockey League season was the first season of the West Coast Hockey League, a North American minor professional league. Six teams participated in the regular season, and the San Diego Gulls were the league champions. The Red Army, a touring Russian team, played in 12 games.

Regular season

Taylor Cup-Playoffs

External links
 Season 1995/96 on hockeydb.com

West Coast Hockey League seasons
WCHL
1995–96 in Russian ice hockey